is a passenger railway station located in the city of Kasai, Hyōgo Prefecture, Japan, operated by the third-sector Hōjō Railway Company.

Lines
Harima-Yokota Station is served by the Hōjō Line and is 11.4 kilometers from the terminus of the line at Ao Station.

Station layout
The station consists of one side platform serving a single bi-directional track. The station is unattended.

Adjacent stations

History
It ceased operations on May 9, 1921 and was abolished on April 5, 1934. A new provisional stop was constructed on the former location on October 1, 1961 and was elevated to a full passenger station on  December 20, 1961. The current station building was completed in December 2014..

Passenger statistics
In fiscal 2018, the station was used by an average of 54 passengers daily.

Surrounding area
 Hyogo Prefectural Hojo High School
 Hyogo Prefectural Harima Agricultural High School

See also
List of railway stations in Japan

References

External links
 
  

Railway stations in Hyōgo Prefecture
Railway stations in Japan opened in 1961
Kasai, Hyōgo